Perch Creek is a  tributary of the Watonwan River in southern Minnesota, United States.  Via the Watonwan, Blue Earth, and Minnesota rivers, it is part of the Mississippi River watershed.

See also
List of rivers of Minnesota
List of longest streams of Minnesota

References

External links
Minnesota Watersheds
USGS Hydrologic Unit Map - State of Minnesota (1974)

Rivers of Minnesota
Tributaries of the Mississippi River